Pea Ridge Township is one of nine townships in Brown County, Illinois, USA.  As of the 2020 census, its population was 163 and it contained 89 housing units.

Geography

Unincorporated towns
 Damon
(This list is based on USGS data and may include former settlements.)

Cemeteries
The township contains these five cemeteries: Becam, Gristy, Knight, Mounds and Reynolds.

Major highways
  US Route 24

Airports and landing strips
 Herren Airport

Demographics
As of the 2020 census there were 163 people, 24 households, and 19 families residing in the township. The racial makeup of the township was 98.16% White, 0.00% African American, 0.00% Native American, 0.61% Asian, 0.00% Pacific Islander, 0.00% from other races, and 1.23% from two or more races. Hispanic or Latino of any race were 0.61% of the population.

There were 24 households, out of which 45.80% had children under the age of 18 living with them, 79.17% were married couples living together, 0.00% had a female householder with no spouse present, and 20.83% were non-families. 20.80% of all households were made up of individuals, and 20.80% had someone living alone who was 65 years of age or older. The average household size was 2.71 and the average family size was 3.16.

The township's age distribution consisted of 33.8% under the age of 18, 0.0% from 18 to 24, 23.1% from 25 to 44, 15.4% from 45 to 64, and 27.7% who were 65 years of age or older. The median age was 41.0 years. For every 100 females, there were 209.5 males. For every 100 females age 18 and over, there were 104.8 males.

The per capita income for the township was $24,598. About 0.0% of families and 7.7% of the population were below the poverty line, including 0.0% of those under age 18 and 27.8% of those age 65 or over.

School districts
 Brown County Community Unit School District 1
 Southeastern Community Unit School District 337

Political districts
 Illinois' 18th congressional district
 State House District 93
 State Senate District 47

References
 
 United States Census Bureau 2007 TIGER/Line Shapefiles
 United States National Atlas

External links
 City-Data.com
 Illinois State Archives

Townships in Brown County, Illinois
Populated places established in 1853
Townships in Illinois
1853 establishments in Illinois